Thillaiyambur is a village in the Kumbakonam taluk of Thanjavur district, Tamil Nadu, India.

Demographics 

As per the 2001 census, Thillaiyambur had a total population of 3282 with 1679 males and 1603 females. The sex ratio was 955. The literacy rate was 67.91.

References 

 

Villages in Thanjavur district